The Shelf Life Extension Program (SLEP) is a joint program of the United States Department of Defense and the Food and Drug Administration that aims to reduce the cost to the military of maintaining stockpiles of certain pharmaceuticals by researching the expiration of drugs.  It tests medications for safety and stability for extended periods of time in controlled storage conditions. In many cases, medications remain effective for years after their printed expiry dates.

References

External links
 SLEP - The DOD/FDA Shelf Life Extension Program
 SLEP information paper - (Archived Copy)
Other studies
 In vitro dissolution of expired antibiotics (Amoxicillin / Ampicillin / Doxycycline)
 Stockpiled Antivirals at or Nearing Expiration (Tamiflu / Relenza)
 Investigative Report: Do Antibiotic Expiration Dates Matter?

Food and Drug Administration
Healthcare in the United States
United States Department of Defense
Packaging
Product expiration